Cyperus microcephalus is a sedge of the family Cyperaceae that is native to northern Australia.

It blooms between January and July and produces green-yellow-brown flowers.

It is found in seasonally dry tropical areas in Queensland, the Northern Territory and Western Australia. In Western Australia it is found on rocky hillsides, cliffs, among boulders, in rock crevices and in creek beds in the Kimberley region where it grows in sandy soils over sandstone.

See also
List of Cyperus species

References

Plants described in 1810
Flora of Western Australia
microcephalus
Taxa named by Robert Brown (botanist, born 1773)
Flora of the Northern Territory
Flora of Queensland